Sergio Álvarez (born 12 August 1948) is a Cuban former sports shooter. He competed in the 50 metre rifle three positions event at the 1968 Summer Olympics.

References

1948 births
Living people
Cuban male sport shooters
Olympic shooters of Cuba
Shooters at the 1968 Summer Olympics
Sportspeople from Havana
20th-century Cuban people